This article includes the list of forms of address used in Spain.

Abbreviations
His/Her Majesty: HM
His/Her Royal Highness: HRH
The Most Excellent: The Most Ext
The Most Illustrious: The Most Ill
The Most Reverend: The Most Rev

Royalty

Nobility

Sources
 
 

Spanish culture
Spain
Spain
Spanish language